Eric Prasanna Weerawardhna MP (born 5 May 1983) is a Sri Lankan politician, a member of the Parliament of Sri Lanka. He belongs to the National People's Power.

See also
List of Dharmaraja College alumni

References

Members of the 14th Parliament of Sri Lanka
Sri Lanka Freedom Party politicians
United People's Freedom Alliance politicians
Living people
1983 births
Sri Lankan Buddhists
Sinhalese politicians